Nancowry (Nancowry language: Mūöt, Hindi: नन्कोव्री Nankovrī) is an island in the central part of the Nicobar Islands chain, located in the northeast Indian Ocean between the Bay of Bengal and the Andaman Sea.

History
In 1755, the government of Denmark formally claimed sovereignty over Nicobars, under the name of Frederiksøerne ("Frederik Islands") and encouraged a mission established by the  Moravian Brethren of Herrnhut. The Danes established a short-lived colony on the island which they named Ny Sjælland ("New Zealand").

Along with Kamorta Island, which lies just to the north, Nancowry Island forms the "magnificent land-locked" Nancowry Harbour, used by European sailors since at least the 17th century and described as "one of the safest natural harbours in the world". The harbour was apparently used as a base for piracy; in 1868, the British Navy entered the harbour in some force, destroying suspected pirate ships.

2004 tsunami
The island, like many others in the Nicobar and Andaman islands, was severely affected by tsunamis generated by the 2004 Indian Ocean earthquake. According to reports from the Andaman and Nicobar Inspector General of Police, S.B. Deol, the Nancowry group of islands were among the worst-hit islands in the chain, with thousands missing and presumed dead.  Post-tsunami satellite photos, and government situation reports indicate that while portions of Nancowry Island were affected, the adjoining islands of Katchall and Kamorta were more severely overrun.  As of January 18, 2005, the government reported only 1 dead and 3 missing from Nancowry island, but 51 dead and 387 missing from Kamorta, and 345 dead and 4310 missing from Katchall.

Demography
As of the 2011 Indian census, there are 1019 persons living on Nancowry island.

Geography
Nancowry Island has an area of 47 km², and located 160 km south-southeast of Car Nicobar, the northernmost Nicobar island. Nancowry, like the Nicobar islands generally, is under the sovereignty of the nation of India. It is also part of the Nicobar and Andaman Tribal Reserve Area, which bars non-native people from visiting or conducting business on the island without permission in hopes of preserving the threatened native communities that live there.

Climate

Administration
The island belongs to the township of Nancowry of Nancowry tehsil.

Image gallery

References 

Space Shuttle Photo of Nancowry and surrounding islands (courtesy Earth Sciences and Image Analysis, NASA-Johnson Space Center). Nancowry is the island on the bottom right. Adjoining it, with Nancowry Harbour between, is Camorta (Kamorta) Is. to the north (up) and Katchall Is. to the west (left).
Government of the Andaman and Nicobar Union Territory (tsunami damage page)
Andaman and Nicobar Police

M.V.R. Murti, et al., Evaluation of Coral Systems through Remote Sensing – A case study in Nicobar Islands, India, presented at Poster Session 2, ACRS 1991. Includes various close-up line maps of the Nancowry group.
Before-and-after satellite photos of Katchall island

Islands of the Andaman and Nicobar Islands
Nicobar district
Nicobar Islands
Islands of India
Populated places in India
Islands of the Bay of Bengal